Robert Beamon (born August 29, 1946) is an American former track and field athlete, best known for his world record in the long jump at the Mexico City Olympics in 1968. By jumping 8.90 m (29 ft. 2.5 in), he broke the existing record by a margin of 55 cm  and his world record stood for almost 23 years until it was broken in 1991 by Mike Powell. The jump is still the Olympic record and the second-longest wind legal jump in history.

Early life
Robert Beamon was born in South Jamaica, Queens, New York, to Naomi Brown Beamon and grew up in the New York Housing Authority's Jamaica Houses. When he was eight months old, his mother died from tuberculosis, and, as a result of his stepfather’s incarceration, was placed into the care of his maternal grandmother, Bessie.

When he was attending Jamaica High School he was discovered by Larry Ellis, a renowned track coach. Beamon later became part of the All-American track and field team. Beamon began his college career at North Carolina Agricultural and Technical State University, to be close to his ill grandmother. After her death, he transferred to the University of Texas at El Paso, where he received a track and field scholarship.

In 1965 Beamon set a national high school triple jump record and was second in the nation in the long jump. In 1967 he won the AAU indoor title and earned a silver medal at the Pan American Games, both in the long jump.

Beamon along with eleven other Black athletes were dropped from the University of Texas at El Paso (UTEP) track and field team the week following the assassination of Martin Luther King Jr. for participating in a boycott of competition with Brigham Young University because of what has been described as the Book of Mormon's racist teachings, although the Book of Mormon's historical and doctrinal statements on ancestry are subject to multiple interpretations. Despite losing his athletic scholarship, Beamon returned to UTEP to continue his studies after the Mexico City Olympics. Fellow Olympian Ralph Boston became his unofficial coach.

1968 Summer Olympics

Beamon entered the 1968 Summer Olympics in Mexico City as the favorite to win the gold medal, having won 22 of the 23 meets he had competed in that year, including a career best of 8.33 m (equivalent to 27 feet 4 inches) and a world's best of 8.39 m  that was ineligible for the record books due to excessive wind assistance. That year he won the AAU and NCAA indoor long jump and triple jump titles, as well as the AAU outdoor long jump title. He came close to missing the Olympic final, overstepping on his first two attempts in qualifying. With only one chance left, Beamon re-measured his approach run from a spot in front of the board and made a fair jump that advanced him to the final. There he faced the two previous gold-medal winners, fellow American Ralph Boston (1960) and Lynn Davies of Great Britain (1964), and twice bronze medallist Igor Ter-Ovanesyan of the Soviet Union.

On October 18, Beamon set a world record for the long jump with a first jump of 8.90 m , bettering the existing record by 55 cm . When the announcer called out the distance for the jump, Beamon—unfamiliar with metric measurements—still did not realize what he had done. When his teammate and coach Ralph Boston told him that he had broken the world record by nearly two feet, his legs gave way and an astonished and overwhelmed Beamon suffered a brief cataplexy attack brought on by the emotional shock, and collapsed to his knees, his body unable to support itself, placing his hands over his face. The defending Olympic champion Lynn Davies told Beamon, "You have destroyed this event", and in sports jargon, a new adjective – Beamonesque – came into use to describe spectacular feats.

Prior to Beamon's jump, the world record had been broken thirteen times since 1901, with an average increase of 6 cm  and the largest increase being 15 cm (6 in.). In the years following the jump, the mark was considered unbeatable.  It took 12 years for another human being to jump 28 feet, much less 29. His world record stood for 23 years until it was finally broken in 1991 when Mike Powell jumped 8.95 m  at the World Championships in Tokyo, but Beamon's jump is still the Olympic record and  years later remains the second-longest wind-legal jump in history. One journalist called Beamon "the man who saw lightning". Sports journalist Dick Schaap wrote a book about the leap, The Perfect Jump.

Beamon landed his jump near the far end of the sand pit, but the optical device which had been installed to measure jump distances was not designed to measure a jump of such length.  This forced the officials to measure the jump manually, which added to the jump's aura.

Beamon's world-record jump was named by Sports Illustrated magazine as one of the five greatest sports moments of the 20th century.

Later life
Shortly after the Mexico City Olympics, Beamon was drafted by the Phoenix Suns in the 15th round of the 1969 NBA draft but never played in an NBA game.
In 1972 he graduated from Adelphi University with a degree in sociology.

Beamon has worked in a variety of roles to promote youth athleticism, including collaborations with former California governor Arnold Schwarzenegger and Beamon's work at the athletic programs of several universities. He is a graphic artist with work exhibited by the Art of the Olympians (AOTO), and was the former chief executive of the Art of the Olympians Museum in Fort Myers, Florida.

1977 Beamon became a track coach at Alliant International University (formerly known as U.S. International University) in San Diego.

Honors
Beamon is in the National Track and Field Hall of Fame, and when the United States Olympic Hall of Fame started to induct athletes in 1983, Beamon was one of the first inductees.
There is a Bob Beamon Street in El Paso, Texas.

References

Further reading
 Beamon, Bob, and Milana Walter Beamon. (1999). The Man Who Could Fly: The Bob Beamon Story. Columbus, MS: Genesis Press. .
 Schaap, Dick. (1976). The Perfect Jump. New York, NY: New American Library.

External links

 
 
 
 
 

1946 births
Living people
American male long jumpers
Sportspeople from Queens, New York
Track and field athletes from New York City
African-American male track and field athletes
Athletes (track and field) at the 1967 Pan American Games
Athletes (track and field) at the 1968 Summer Olympics
Olympic gold medalists for the United States in track and field
World record setters in athletics (track and field)
North Carolina A&T State University alumni
UTEP Miners men's track and field athletes
North Carolina A&T Aggies men's track and field athletes
Pan American Games silver medalists for the United States
Pan American Games medalists in athletics (track and field)
Phoenix Suns draft picks
Jamaica High School (New York City) alumni
Medalists at the 1968 Summer Olympics
Track & Field News Athlete of the Year winners
Medalists at the 1967 Pan American Games
21st-century African-American people
20th-century African-American sportspeople